Fred Lonzo (born August 26, 1950), also known as Freddie Lonzo, is a jazz trombonist.

Born in New Orleans, Louisiana, Lonzo is one of the most highly regarded practitioners of "tailgate" style traditional jazz trombone. His style is distinctly his own, but such influences as Kid Ory and Frog Joseph can be heard.

Lonzo has played with such brass bands as Doc Paulin's, the Imperial, Olympia, and Young Tuxedo.

Lonzo has played and recorded with such notables as Alvin Alcorn, Doc Cheatham, Evan Christopher, Lars Edegran, Bob French, Wynton Marsalis, Teddy Riley, Dr. Michael White, Wendell Brunious and Sammy Rimington.

In New Orleans, he regularly plays at such venues as Donna's, the Palm Court Jazz Cafe, and Preservation Hall.

References
 New Orleans Jazz: A Family Album by Al Rose and Edmond Souchon, Third Edition, Louisiana State University Press, 1984
 TrombonesOnline biography

Living people
Jazz musicians from New Orleans
1950 births
American jazz trombonists
Male trombonists
21st-century trombonists
21st-century American male musicians
American male jazz musicians
Olympia Brass Band members
Young Tuxedo Brass Band members